was a Japanese leprologist. He was the son of first Shobun Gotō and was called the "second Shobun Gotō". He devoted his life to leprosy patients in Japan and on the island of Molokai in the Kingdom of Hawaii.

Father Damien had trust in Gōtō's therapy, and he left the message, "I have not the slightest confidence in our American and European doctors to stay my leprosy, I wish to be treated by Dr. Masanao Gotō."

See also 
Father Damien
King David Kalakaua
Walter M. Gibson
Kalaupapa National Historical Park

References

External links 

 Masanao Goto (Hawaii Medical Library) 
 THE LEPERS OF MOLOKAI. May 26, 1889, New York Times 
 後藤昌文・昌直父子の事績を追って　オノーレ文化情報研究所　 
 明治34年東京市会議員総選挙麻布区選挙結果

1857 births
1908 deaths
Japanese leprologists
Japanese humanitarians
People from Hawaii